Francesco Loi (February 21, 1891 – March 9, 1977) was an Italian gymnast who competed in the 1912 Summer Olympics and in the 1920 Summer Olympics. He was born in Cagliari. He was part of the Italian team, which was able to win the gold medal in the gymnastics men's team, European system event in 1912 as well as in 1920.

References

1891 births
1977 deaths
Sportspeople from Cagliari
Italian male artistic gymnasts
Gymnasts at the 1912 Summer Olympics
Gymnasts at the 1920 Summer Olympics
Olympic gymnasts of Italy
Olympic gold medalists for Italy
Olympic medalists in gymnastics
Medalists at the 1920 Summer Olympics
Medalists at the 1912 Summer Olympics